The Cellophane paradox (also the Cellophane trap or Cellophane fallacy or gingerbread paradox) describes a type of incorrect reasoning used in market regulation methods.

The paradox arises when a firm sells a product with few substitutes, which in turn allows the firm to increase the price of that product. The original reason was that as the price increases, the product will reach a point where it begins to attract more and more substitutes. In technical economic terms, such a product has very low cross-price elasticity of demand. The situation is linked to a United States Supreme Court case and a subsequent response in economic literature.

Cellophane was a DuPont company that made flexible wrapping material. It had its U.S. production restricted to du Pont by numerous patents in the early 1950s. Du Pont was sued under the Sherman Act for monopolization of the cellophane market by the U.S. Justice Department, and the case (U.S. v. E. I. du Pont) was decided by the Supreme Court in 1956. The Court agreed with du Pont that when evaluated at the monopolistic price observed in the early 1950s, there were many substitutes for cellophane and, therefore, du Pont had only a small share of the market for wrapping materials (i.e., it possessed little or no market power).

This reasoning was challenged by a 1955 article in the American Economic Review. In research on the du Pont company arising from his PhD dissertation, Willard F. Mueller and co-author George W. Stocking, Sr. pointed out the error of mistaking a monopolist's inability to exercise market power by raising price above the current price for an inability to have already exercised market power by raising price significantly above the competitive price. Courts that use a monopolized product's elevated market price will typically misconstrue a completed anti-competitive act as a lack of market power. Had the Supreme Court considered the substitutability of other wrappings at cellophane's competitive price, the sales of other wrappings would have been much lower; du Pont might very well have been found guilty of monopolizing the market for flexible wrappings.

As Richard Posner wrote, 
"Reasonable interchangeability at the current price but not at a competitive price level, far from demonstrating the absence of monopoly power, might well be a symptom of that power; this elementary point was completely overlooked by the court"

The problem continues to bedevil efforts by antitrust agencies to define markets.  Defining markets by cross-elasticity of demand requires a reference price:  If I raise my price by 5% from some base level, will people switch to a competing good?  The problem is that a firm that actually does have a monopoly power still faces constraints on its ability to charge whatever price it wants; those constraints are set by consumers’ willingness to pay.  If a monopolist already charges the profit-maximizing price, an increase above that price will cause consumers to stop buying the product; that’s why the lower price was already profit-maximizing.  So we can’t just use the price a company already charges as the base level, or we will conclude that even monopolists lack market power.

Antitrust can solve this problem by using some measure of average cost, not the actual market price, as the baseline for the question whether a merger would allow the merged firm to increase price.   But that means that the relevant question is not whether consumers would pay more for a can of Coke or a Harry Potter novel than they currently do; it is whether they would pay 5% more for the can of Coke than it cost to make, deliver, and sell it.

References

External links
 The Cellophane Case and the New Competition; The American Economic Review, Vol. 45, No. 1 (Mar., 1955), pp. 29-63  The original article by George W. Stocking and Willard F. Mueller

Market structure
Competition law